Yevgeny Vladimirovich Sidikhin is a Russian film and theater actor and television presenter.

Early life and education
Sidikhin was born in  Leningrad, Russian SFSR, Soviet Union (now Saint Petersburg, Russia). He studied martial arts and boxing from the 4th grade and was a five-time champion in the City of Leningrad. 

After high school he was accepted into the Leningrad State Institute of Theater, Music, and Cinematography (LGITMiK). However, in his freshman year, he was drafted into the army. He served in Turkmenistan and in the military intelligence in Afghanistan.  After completing his service, he returned to LGITMiK and graduated in 1989.

Career
He worked at the Lensovet Theater and the Tovstonogov Bolshoi Drama Theater and had a brief career of a talk show host at the Russian television channel NTV. He starred in his first film in 1991. Many of his roles take advantage of his martial arts skills and good looks; however, he always plays the emotional and human side of the character.

Awards
2000 – State Prize of Russia (for the film The Barracks)
2002 – Best Actor in a Foreign Film at the film festival  Constellation  for 27 Missing Kisses
2003 – Best Male Role in The Ark at the film festival  Faces of Love in Moscow
2003 – Diploma for Performing Excellence at the film festival of Slavic and Eastern Orthodox Peoples Golden Knight (Zolotoy Vityaz) for the film Between Life and Death
2004 – Golden Eagle (Zolotoi Oryol) for the best male role in the TV series The Cab Driver

Personal life
Yevgeny Sidikhin is married to actress Tatyana Borkovskaya and they have three daughters. His hobby is sailing yachts.

Selected filmography

References

External links

Yevgeny Sidikhin Official Site 
Yevgeny Sidikhin's Forum 

1964 births
Soviet male film actors
Russian male film actors
Russian male television actors
Russian male stage actors
Living people
Russian television presenters
State Prize of the Russian Federation laureates
Male actors from Saint Petersburg